Isaksson is a surname of Swedish origin.

Geographical distribution
As of 2014, 89.4% of all known bearers of the surname Isaksson were residents of Sweden (frequency 1:774), 6.0% of Finland (1:6,482) and 1.3% of the United States (1:1,911,382).

In Sweden, the frequency of the surname was higher than national average ( 1:774) in the following counties:
 1. Norrbotten County (1:122)
 2. Västerbotten County (1:393)
 3. Jönköping County (1:409)
 4. Kronoberg County (1:565)
 5. Halland County (1:614)
 6. Kalmar County (1:658)
 7. Västernorrland County (1:703)
 8. Jämtland County (1:763)

In Finland, the frequency of the surname was higher than national average (1:6,482) in the following regions:
 1. Åland (1:448)
 2. Southwest Finland (1:1,696)
 3. Ostrobothnia (1:2,414)
 4. Central Ostrobothnia (1:5,144)
 5. Uusimaa (1:5,145)

People
Selim Isakson (1892-1960), Major-General and General Officer Commanding Kymi Military District during World War II. 
Anders Isaksson (1943–2009), Swedish journalist, writer, and historian
Andreas Isaksson (b. 1981), Swedish football player
Fredrik Isaksson (b. 1971), Swedish heavy-metal guitarist
Kjell Isaksson (b. 1948), Swedish pole vaulter
Magnus Isaksson (b. 1987), Swedish ice hockey player
Patrik Isaksson (swimmer) (b. 1973), Swedish Olympic swimmer
Patrik Isaksson (singer) (b. 1972), Swedish rock singer and songwriter
Ulla Isaksson (1916-2000), Swedish novelist and screenplay writer

References

Swedish-language surnames
Patronymic surnames
Surnames from given names